The Second Working Cabinet,, was an Indonesian
cabinet that served from 18 February 1960 until 6 March 1962, when President Sukarno reshuffled
it.

Composition

Cabinet Leadership
Prime Minister: Sukarno
First Minister: Djuanda Kartawidjaja
Deputy Prime Minister: Johannes Leimena

Core Cabinet Ministers
Minister of National Defense: Lt. Gen. Abdul Haris Nasution
Minister of Foreign Affairs: Subandrio
Minister of Home Affairs and Autonomy: Ipik Gandamana
Minister of Justice: Sahardjo
Minister of Finance I: Djuanda
Minister of Finance II: Notohamiprodjo
Minister of Production: Col. Suprajogi
Minister of Distribution: Johannes Leimena
Minister of Development: Chairul Saleh
Minister of Public Prosperity: Muljadi Djojomartono
Minister of Health: Col. Dr. Satrio
Minister of Education & Culture: Prijono
Minister of Religious Affairs: Wahib Wahab
Minister/Deputy Chairman of the People's Representative Council: Roeslan
Abdulgani
Minister/Chairman of the National Planning Agency Muhammad Yamin
Minister of Relations with the Legislature: W. J. Rumambi
Minister/Presidential Legal Adviser: Wirjono Prodjodikoro

Non-Core Cabinet Ministers

First Ministerial Section
Minister of Information: Maladi
Minister of Relations with Religious Scholars: Fatah Jasin
Minister of Manpower Mobilization: Sudibjo
Minister of Manpower Mobilization: Soedjono

National Security Ministry Section
Minister/Deputy Minister for National Defense: Maj. Gen. Hidajat
Minister/Chief-of-Staff of the Army: Gen. A. H. Nasution
Minister/Chief-of-Staff of the Navy: Com. R.E. Martadinata
Minister/Chief-of-Staff of the Air Force: Air Marshal S. Surjadarma
Minister/Chief of the National Police: Insp. Gen. Soekarno Djojonegoro
Deputy Minister of State for Veterans' Affairs: Col. Sambas Atmadinata
Minister/Attorney General: Gunawan

Production Ministry Section
Minister of Agriculture: Brig. Gen. Azis Saleh
Minister of Public Works and Power: Sardjono Dipokusumo
Minister of Labor: Ahem Erningpradja

Distribution Ministry Section
Minister of Land Transportation and Post, Telecommunications and Tourism: Maj. Gen. Djatikoesoemo
Junior Minister of Maritime Transportation: Abdul Mutalib Danuningrat
Junior Minister of Air Transportation: Colonel R. Iskander
Junior Minister of Trade: Arifin Harahap

Development Ministry Section
Minister of Basic Industries and Mining: Chairul Saleh
Minister of People's Industry: R. Suharto
Minister of Agrarian Affairs: Sadjarwo
Minister of Transmigration, Cooperatives & Development of Village Communities: Achmadi

Ministry Level Officials
Chairman of the State Apparatus Oversight Agency: Sultan Hamengkubuwana IX

Changes
 From 1 July 1960, Djuanda was no longer Finance Minister.
On 20 December 1960, Subandrio was appointed Secondy Deputy First Minister. He retained his position as Foreign Minister.
 On 3 March 1962, the position of Minister of Education & Culture was renamed Minister of Education, Knowledge & Culture. A new section, Education, Knowledge & Culture, was formed comprising the Ministry of Basic Education and Culture, led by Minister Prijono and the Ministry of Higher Education and Knowledge, led by Iwa Kusumasumantri.
 On 19 January 1962, Minister/Air Force Chief of Staff Air Marshal S. Surjadarma was replaced by Air Vice Marshal Omar Dani.
 On 28 February 1962, Minister of Religious Affairs Wahib Wahab was replaced by Sjaifuddin Zuchris

References
 

Cabinets of Indonesia
1960 establishments in Indonesia
1962 disestablishments in Indonesia
Cabinets established in 1960
Cabinets disestablished in 1962